Confederate colonies were made up of Confederate refugees who were displaced or fled their homes during or immediately after the American Civil War. They migrated to various countries, but especially Brazil, where slavery remained legal, and to a lesser extent Mexico and British Honduras (modern Belize).

Background
Many Southerners had lost their land during the war and some were unwilling to live under the Federal government. They did not expect an improvement in the South's economic position. Most of the emigrants were from the states of Alabama, Texas, Louisiana, Mississippi, Georgia, South Carolina, and Missouri. It is unknown how many American southerners emigrated to Latin America. As noted in unpublished research, Betty Antunes de Oliveira found in port records of Rio de Janeiro that some 20,000 Americans entered Brazil from 1865 to 1885. Other researchers have estimated the number at 10,000. An unknown number returned to the United States after the end of Reconstruction, but many of the remaining immigrants who stayed adopted Brazilian citizenship.

In Mexico, Emperor Maximilian had encouraged and subsidized foreign colonization with land grants and appropriation of land. After the French withdrew their support of Maximilian and he was defeated in 1867, these colonies ceased to exist. The land titles were not recognized by the victorious Mexican republicans, who had spent years fighting an Imperial government that was imposed upon them.

See also

Brazil
Americana, São Paulo
Confederados
New Texas
British Honduras
Confederate settlements in British Honduras
Colin J. McRae
Mexico
New Virginia Colony
Other
Knights of the Golden Circle

References

Further reading

 Michael L. Conniff and Cyrus B. Dawsey, editors, The Confederados: Old South Immigrants in Brazil. Auburn: University of Alabama. The Confederados: Old South Immigrants in Brazil, Auburn: University of Alabama.  
 Eugene C. Harter, The Lost Colony of the Confederacy, Oxford: University Press of Mississippi.    
 William Clark Griggs, The Elusive Eden: Frank McMullan's Confederate Colony in Brazil Austin: University of Texas, 1987, about the failed Iguape Colony.
 Riccardo Orizio (Avril Bardoni, translator), Lost White Tribes: The End of Privilege and the Last Colonials in Sri Lanka, Jamaica, Brazil, Haiti, Namibia & Guadeloupe.  
 Alan M. Tigay, "The Deepest South", American Heritage 49(2), April 1998, pp. 84–95
 Judith McKnight Jones, a descendant, wrote about the immigration and family trees. Her book Soldado Descansa lists some 400 families and is in Portuguese. 
 Alcides Fernando Gussi, Os Norte-Americanos Confederados do Brasil''. 
 Auburn University in Alabama maintains a special collection of material related to the Confederado immigration, including correspondence, memoirs, genealogies, and newspaper clippings, especially related to Colonel Norris.

External links
A Brief History of the Confederate Colonies of Brazil
The Lost Cause: The Confederate Exodus to Mexico
The Confederacy's Plan to Conqueror Latin America
 Os Confederados

American diaspora
American refugees
American emigrants to Brazil
American emigrants to Mexico
Confederate expatriates
Historical migrations
History of the Southern United States
Settlement schemes
Social history of the American Civil War